Sir William Chichele Plowden  (1832 – 4 September 1915) was a Civil Servant and Member of the Legislative Council in India, and subsequently a Liberal politician who sat in the House of Commons from 1886 to 1892.

Plowden was the son of William Plowden FRS MP of Ewhurst Park and his wife Jane Annette Campbell, daughter of Edward Campbell. He was educated at Harrow School and Haileybury College.  He was in the Bengal Civil Service as Census Commissioner for India and Secretary of the Board of Revenue of the North West Provinces. He was also a member of the Legislative Council in Calcutta. In 1886, he was knighted as KCSI.

In the 1886 general election, Plowden was elected Member of Parliament (MP) for Wolverhampton West and held the seat until 1892.
 
Plowden married Emily Frances Ann Bass (1841–1915), the eldest daughter of [[Michael Thomas Bass Jr., MP for Derby and his wife, Eliza Jane Arden.  Emily was the sister of Lord Burton and Hamar Alfred Bass. The Plowdens lived at Aston Rowant House, Oxfordshire, and at 5 Park Crescent, Portland Place. They had a daughter, Margaret who married Hubert Mostyn, 7th Lord Vaux.

References

External links 
 

1832 births
1915 deaths
People educated at Harrow School
People educated at Haileybury and Imperial Service College
Liberal Party (UK) MPs for English constituencies
UK MPs 1886–1892
Knights Commander of the Order of the Star of India